Thomas Howe (6 May 1892 – 1957) was an English footballer who played in the Football League for Stoke.

Career
Howe was signed as a reserve defender to Bob McGrory, Howe was at the Victoria Ground for five years and had a couple of decent runs in the first-team, the best being 24 appearances in the 1923–24 season. After his release in 1925 he spent eight months out of the game before joining Featherstone Rovers.

Career statistics

References

English footballers
Stoke City F.C. players
English Football League players
1892 births
1957 deaths
Association football fullbacks